Enteritis is inflammation of the small intestine. It is most commonly caused by food or drink contaminated with pathogenic microbes, such as serratia, but may have other causes such as NSAIDs, radiation therapy as well as autoimmune conditions like Crohn's disease and celiac disease. Symptoms include abdominal pain, cramping, diarrhea, dehydration, and fever. Related diseases of the gastrointestinal system include inflammation of the stomach and large intestine.

Duodenitis, jejunitis and ileitis are subtypes of enteritis which are localised to a specific part of the small intestine. Inflammation of both the stomach and small intestine is referred to as gastroenteritis.

Signs and symptoms 
Signs and symptoms of enteritis are highly variable and vary based on the specific cause and other factors such as individual variance and stage of disease.
Symptoms may include abdominal pain, cramping, diarrhea, dehydration, fever, nausea, vomiting and weight loss.

Causes

Autoimmune 
Crohn's disease – also known as regional enteritis, it can occur along any surface of the gastrointestinal tract. In 40% of cases, it is limited to the small intestine.

Coeliac disease – caused by an autoimmune reaction to gluten by genetically predisposed individuals.

Eosinophilic enteropathy – a condition where eosinophils build up in the gastrointestinal tract and blood vessels, leading to polyp formation, necrosis, inflammation and ulcers. It is most commonly seen in patients with a history of atopy, however is overall relatively uncommon.

Infectious enteritis 
In Germany, 90% of cases of infectious enteritis are caused by four pathogens, Norovirus, Rotavirus, Campylobacter and Salmonella. Other common causes of infectious enteritis include bacteria such as Shigella and E. coli, as well as viruses such as adenovirus, astrovirus and calicivirus. Other less common pathogens include Bacillus cereus, Clostridium perfringens, Clostridium difficile and Staphylococcus aureus.

Campylobacter jejuni  is one of the most common sources of infectious enteritis, and the most common bacterial pathogen found in 2 year old and smaller children with diarrhoea. It has been linked to consumption of contaminated water and food, most commonly poultry and milk. The disease tends to be less severe in developing countries, due to the constant exposure which people have with the antigen in the environment, leading to early development of antibodies.

Rotavirus is responsible for infecting 140 million people and causing 1 million deaths each year, mostly in children younger than 5 years. This makes it the most common cause of severe childhood diarrhoea and diarrhea-related deaths in the world. It selectively targets mature enterocytes in the small intestine, causing malabsorption, as well as inducing secretion of water. It has also been observed to cause villus ischemia, and increase intestinal motility. The net result of these changes is induced diarrhoea.

Enteritis necroticans is an often fatal illness, caused by β-toxin of Clostridium perfringens. This causes inflammation and segments of necrosis throughout the gastrointestinal tract. It is most common in developing countries, however has also been documented in post-World War II Germany. Risk factors for enteritis necroticans include decreased trypsin activity, which prevent intestinal degradation of the toxin, and reduced intestinal motility, which increases likelihood of toxin accumulation.

Vascular disease 
Ischemic enteritis is uncommon compared to ischemic colitis due to the highly vascularised nature of the small intestine, allowing for sufficient blood flow in most situations. It develops due to circulatory shock of mesenteric vessels in the absence of major vessel occlusion, often associated with an underlying condition such as hypertension, arrhythmia or diabetes. Thus it has been considered to be associated with atherosclerosis. Surgical treatment is usually required due to the likelihood of stenosis or complete occlusion of the small intestine. Ischemic damage can range from mucosal infarction, which is limited only to the mucosa; mural infarction of the mucosa and underlying submucosa; to transmural infarction of the full thickness of the gastrointestinal wall. Mucosal and mural infarcts in and of themselves may not be fatal, however may progress further to a transmural infarct. This has the potential for perforation of the wall, leading to peritonitis.

Radiation enteritis 

Inflammation of the gastrointestinal tract is common after treatment with radiation therapy to the abdomen or pelvis. It is classified as early if it manifests within the first 3 months, and delayed if it manifests 3 months after treatment. Early radiation enteritis is caused by cell death of the crypt epithelium and subsequent mucosal inflammation, however usually subsides after the course of radiation therapy is completed. Delayed radiation enteritis is a chronic disease which has a complex pathogenesis involving changes in the majority of the intestinal wall.

Diagnosis 
Diagnosis may be simple in cases where the patient's signs and symptoms are idiopathic to a specific cause. However, this is generally not the case, considering that many pathogens which cause enteritis may exhibit similar symptoms, especially early in the disease. In particular, campylobacter, shigella, salmonella and many other bacteria induce acute self-limited colitis, an inflammation of the lining of the colon which appears similar under the microscope.

A medical history, physical examination and tests such as blood counts, stool cultures, CT scans, MRIs, PCRs, colonoscopies and upper endoscopies may be used in order to perform a differential diagnosis. A biopsy may be required to obtain a sample for histopathology.

Treatment 
Mild cases usually do not require treatment and will go away after a few days in healthy people. In cases where symptoms persist or when it is more severe, specific treatments based on the initial cause may be required.

In cases where diarrhea is present, replenishing fluids lost is recommended, and in cases with prolonged or severe diarrhoea which persists, intravenous rehydration therapy or antibiotics may be required. A simple oral rehydration therapy (ORS) can be made by dissolving one teaspoon of salt, eight teaspoons of sugar and the juice of an orange into one litre of clean water. Studies have shown the efficacy of antibiotics in reducing the duration of the symptoms of infectious enteritis of bacterial origin, however antibiotic treatments are usually not required due to the self-limiting duration of infectious enteritis.

Etymology
The word enteritis uses combining forms of entero- and -itis, both New Latin from Greek, respectively from ἑντερον (enteron, small intestine) and -ιτις (-itis, inflammation).

See also
 Enteropathy
 Staphylococcal enteritis

References

External links 

Inflammations
Intestinal infectious diseases